Neoregelia silvimontana is a species of flowering plant in the genus Neoregelia. This species is endemic to Brazil (the state of Bahia). Its name has also been spelt Neoregelia silvomontana.

References

silvimontana
Flora of Brazil